The 1926 Western Kentucky State Normal Hilltoppers football team represented Western Kentucky State Normal School and Teachers College (now known as Western Kentucky University) as a member of the Southern Intercollegiate Athletic Association during the 1926 college football season. They were coached by Edgar Diddle in his fifth year.

Schedule

References

Western Kentucky State Normal
Western Kentucky Hilltoppers football seasons
Western Kentucky State Normal Hilltoppers football